Wolfmother are an Australian hard rock band formed in 2000 by vocalist and guitarist Andrew Stockdale, bassist and keyboardist Chris Ross, and drummer Myles Heskett. They have released three studio albums: Wolfmother (October 2005); Cosmic Egg (October 2009) and New Crown (March 2014). Wolfmother has won national and international awards, including three Australian Recording Industry Association (ARIA) Music Awards, three Australasian Performing Right Association (APRA) Awards and one Grammy Award.

Their self-titled debut album won the 2005 J Award for Best Australian Album. A song from the album, "Woman" was nominated for Single of the Year and Best Breakthrough Artist – Single at the ARIA Awards, eventually losing out to Ben Lee's "Catch My Disease" and End of Fashion's "O Yeah", respectively. The following year, the album won the ARIA Award for Best Breakthrough Album, Best Rock Album, and the band won for Best Group; they also received nominations for Album of the Year (for Wolfmother) and Single of the Year (for "Mind's Eye"). In the same year, Wolfmother received nominations for Spankin' New Aussie Artist, Best New Group and Best Rock Video (for "Mind's Eye") at the MTV Australia Awards and a Jack Award nomination for Best Live Band. 

Wolfmother were nominated for International Breakthrough Act at the 2007 BRIT Awards, ultimately losing out to American band Orson. At the 2007 Grammy Awards the band won the Grammy Award for Best Hard Rock Performance for their song "Woman". They were the first Australian band in twenty five years to win this award. In the same year, they also received the Jack Award for Best Live Band,  and were nominated for four MTV Australia Awards: Best Group, Viewer's Choice Award, Best Rock Video and Video of the Year (the latter two for the song "Joker & the Thief"). The following year, Wolfmother garnered the APRA Award for Most Played Australian Work Overseas, for their song "Woman". The band's second album, Cosmic Egg (2009) received a nomination in 2010 for Album of the Year in Classic Rock magazine's Roll of Honour.

APRA Awards

The annual APRA Awards have been presented by the Australasian Performing Right Association (APRA) and Australasian Mechanical Copyright Owners Society (AMCOS) since 1997, and previously, by APRA alone, since 1982. APRA-AMCOS are the copyright collection agencies for Australian and New Zealand artists. They have provided trophies for "songwriters and publishers that have achieved outstanding success in their fields" within Australia in thirteen categories with nine (including Most Played Australian Work Overseas) based on statistical analysis, three categories (including Breakthrough Songwriter Award and Songwriter of the Year) are decided by APRA's Board of Directors and the final award (Song of the Year) is determined by a poll of APRA members (comprising some 87,000 songwriters, composers and music publishers). Wolfmother have received three awards from three nominations.

ARIA Music Awards

Since 1987 the annual ARIA Music Awards have been presented by the Australian Recording Industry Association (ARIA), which is "the  peak  trade  body  for  the  recorded music industry" in that country. In 2009, out of 28 categories 26 were peer-voted: genre categories are judged by "voting schools" that consist of 40–100 representatives from that genre; generalist categories are determined by the "voting academy", which had 1106 representatives from across the music industry. Two other categories – Highest Selling Album and Highest Selling Single – were based on "audited sales results." Wolfmother have received three awards from ten nominations.

MTV Australia Awards

The annual MTV Australia Awards have been presented by television channel, MTV Australia, since 2005, with categories voted for by its viewers. Wolfmother have received seven nominations.

Triple J Hottest 100

The annual music poll Triple J Hottest 100 was inaugurated in 1989 and is based on the public votes by listeners of Australian youth radio station Triple J. Billboards Lars Brandle reported in January 2015 that "the state-funded Triple J network announced more than 2.099 million votes were cast by 258,762 listeners for this year's poll, a new record for an event now in its 22nd year." Wolfmother have scored eleven songs in the annual Hottest 100. Six songs by Wolfmother entered the listing in 2005, which at the time was the highest number of entries in a single Hottest 100 chart for an Australian artist. Also that year, Wolfmother's self-titled debut album was listed as the top album of the year. In 2011, the album was named one of the Triple J Hottest 100 Australian Albums of All Time.

Other awards and nominations

The annual J Award, for the Australian Album of the Year, is presented by Triple J, which is determined by the station's musical director, Richard Kingsmill. In 2005 Wolfmother became the inaugural winners from their one nomination. The annual Channel [V] Awards are presented by Channel [V] Australia. The annual Jack Awards were presented in Australia from 2004 to 2007 and were sponsored by Jack Daniel's, an American Tennessee whiskey company. Wolfmother have received one award from two nominations. The BRIT Awards are presented by the British Phonographic Industry, first in 1977, and then annually from 1982. By 2001 they were voted for by over 1,000 people including: BPI member companies, DJs, music press, TV presenters, music industry members, lawyers, accountants, promoters and NUS entertainment officers. Wolfmother have received one nomination. The annual Canadian Indie Music Awards are presented during Canadian Music Week, which has been held since 1981 with "winners determined by a combination of fan and industry voting." Wolfmother have been nominated for one category. The annual Grammy Awards are presented by the National Academy of Recording Arts and Sciences, with winners decided by ballots of voting members. Wolfmother have received one award from one nomination.

References

External links

Awards
Lists of awards received by Australian musician
Lists of awards received by musical group